Pervomaysky District is an administrative district (raion), one of the 10 raions of Novosibirsk, Russia. Population: 87,912  (2018 Census).

History
In 1933, the Eikhovsky District was established. It arose with the construction of the Eikhe Railway Station.

During World War II, many Soviet enterprises were evacuated to the district.

In 1938, Eikhovsky District was renamed the Pervomaysky District.

Microdistricts
 KSM Microdistrict
 Vesenny Microdistrict

Parks
 Pervomaysky Park
 Detsky Park

Education

 Novosibirsk Electromechanical College is an educational institution opened in 1943.
 Technical School of Railway Transport
 Novosibirsk College of Postal Communication and Services
 Vocational Training Center No. 2 named after Y. M. Naumov
 School No. 214 named after Elizaveta Glinka is an educational institution opened in 2018.

Libraries
 Krylov Library
 Kuprin Library
 Pushkaryov Library
 Shukshin Library
 Central District Library named after Chernyshevsky
 Chukovsky Library
 Svetlov Library
 Family Reading Library named after Dubinin

Cemeteries
 Pervomayskoye Cemetery of Prisoners of War is a cemetery of German prisoners of war restored by the German War Graves Commission. The reestablished cemetery was opened on November 19, 1995.
 Inskoye Cemetery
 Staroye Cemetery

Sports
 Pervomayets Combat Sports Club, it was founded by workers of the Novosibirsk Electric Locomotive Repair Plant in 1965.
 Lokomotiv Stadium

Economy

Industry
 Novosibirsk Electric Locomotive Repair Plant
 Novosibirsk Switch Plant
 Novosibirsk Metal Cutting Plant is a manufacturer company based in 2015.

Transportation

Railway
Nine railway stations are located in the district: Razyezd-Inya, Novogodnyaya, Pervomayskaya, Inskaya, Sibirskaya, Zvyozdnaya, Rechport, Matveyevka, Yunost.

Notable residents
 Vladimir Gorodetsky (born 1948) is a Russian politician, the former mayor of Novosibirsk, the governor of Novosibirsk Oblast from 2014 to 2017.

References

External links
 The district of singing trains. NGS. Район поющих поездов. НГС.
 Homeland of switchmen. NGS. Родина стрелочников. НГС.